The Salmson-Béchereau SB-4 was a passenger aircraft built by the French company Salmson in the early 1920s.

Design
The SB-4 was a high-wing monoplane intended to be used for tourist purposes, with provisions for one passenger. Only one aircraft was built.

Specifications

References

1920s French airliners
SB-4
Single-engined tractor aircraft
High-wing aircraft